Dennis Gregory Pitta Jr. (born June 29, 1985) is a former American football tight end. He played college football at BYU, where he was a consensus All-American. He was drafted by the Baltimore Ravens in the fourth round of the 2010 NFL Draft. After two strong seasons in the NFL, Pitta suffered a hip injury in 2013 and played only occasionally until 2016, when he had his best NFL season. A further injury in 2017 ended his career.

Early years
Pitta was born in Fresno, California to parents Dennis and Linda Pitta.  His father played college football as a middle linebacker for California from 1968 to 1969.  Pitta attended Moorpark High School in Moorpark, California, where he earned letters in football, basketball, and track. He is an Eagle Scout.  He played football as a wide receiver and cornerback, and his large size made him difficult to cover. As a senior in 2002, Pitta recorded 64 receptions for 1,150 yards and 13 touchdowns. That season, he was named a first-team all-county, all-league, and all-area player. He was a scholar-athlete all four years in high school and was also named a National Football Foundation Scholar Athlete. Pitta was shown interest by Dartmouth, Navy, Oklahoma State, Oregon, Utah, and Yale, but no Division I school offered him a scholarship.

College career
Pitta chose to attend Brigham Young University, where he walked onto the BYU Cougars football team as a wide receiver.  Pitta was moved to tight end by head coach Gary Crowton, where he soon earned a scholarship.  He sat out the 2003 season on "grayshirt" status. In 2004, he saw significant playing time as a result of an injury to starter Daniel Coats. Pitta recorded 17 receptions for 176 yards and two touchdowns, and actually finished the season with more receptions than Coats. Both of his scores came in the game against Air Force, where he also blocked a punt upon which BYU capitalized for a score.

Pitta is a member of the Church of Jesus Christ of Latter-day Saints. Pitta served a mission for the church in the Dominican Republic, which caused a two-year hiatus in his college football career. He returned to BYU for the 2007 season, and recorded 59 receptions for 813 yards and five touchdowns. He finished the season as the nation's fifth-leading tight end in yards per game at 63. Pitta was named to the All-Mountain West Conference (MWC) first-team, and he also received Academic All-MWC honors.

In 2008, he recorded 83 receptions for 1,083 yards and six touchdowns. Against Northern Iowa, he compiled 213 yards, which broke the conference receiving yards record for a tight end and earned him the John Mackey Tight End of the Week honors. Against Colorado State, he caught the game-winning 17-yard touchdown pass from quarterback Max Hall, and was named the John Mackey Tight End of the Week and a MWC Co-Offensive Player of the Week. Pitta finished the season as the team's second-leading receiver. He was a Lombardi Award and Biletnikoff Award candidate, and a Mackey Award semifinalist. Pitta was named to the All-MWC first-team, and again received Academic All-MWC honors. College Football News and Sports Illustrated named him an honorable mention All-American, and Rivals.com named him to its All-America third-team.

Prior to the 2009 season, The NFL Draft Scout, a CBS Sports affiliate, rated Pitta as the sixth-ranked out of 92 tight ends available for the 2010 NFL Draft. They project him as being selected in the third or fourth round. Phil Steele's assessed him as the fourth-ranked draft-eligible tight end and placed him on its preseason All-America fourth team.

He was one of three finalists for the Mackey Award. He was named to the 2009 All-MWC first-team and the 2009 AFCA Coaches' All-America team.

Dennis Pitta, Reception Records in BYU Cougars football History

Professional career

Pitta was selected by the Baltimore Ravens in the fourth round (114th overall) of the 2010 NFL Draft. The pick was one of three that the Ravens acquired in a trade with the Denver Broncos on the first night of the draft on April 22. The Broncos received a first-round pick which was used to select Tim Tebow. Pitta was signed to a three-year contract on June 21, 2010.

2010
Pitta recorded his first career reception in Week 2, for one yard. It was his only catch of the game and the 2010 season.

2011
Pitta improved greatly in the 2011 season, becoming a common target for quarterback Joe Flacco and contributing to a dangerous tight end tandem alongside starter Ed Dickson. He did not, however, score a touchdown until a Week 12 Thanksgiving Day matchup with the San Francisco 49ers. Pitta scored the game's only touchdown off of an eight-yard catch, as the Ravens won 16-6.

Pitta scored his second touchdown of the season two weeks later in a game against the Indianapolis Colts. In the Ravens' season finale, he was the team's leading receiver with six catches, a then-career-high 62 yards and his third career touchdown. Pitta finished the year with 40 catches, 405 yards and three touchdowns.

Pitta played a steady role in the AFC Championship Game against the New England Patriots, catching five passes for 41 yards, including the Ravens' first touchdown of the game. However, Baltimore's season would come to an end here, after receiver Lee Evans dropped a game-winning touchdown and kicker Billy Cundiff missed a short, game-tying field goal that would have sent the game to overtime.

2012
Pitta would have an even better season in 2012. In the Ravens' season opener against the division rival Cincinnati Bengals, Pitta caught 5 passes for 73 yards and a touchdown, with Flacco targeting him 10 times. He led the Ravens in receiving as they blew out the Bengals 44-13.

In Week 3, the Ravens faced the team that ended their Super Bowl chances the previous season; the New England Patriots. Pitta contributed with five catches and 50 yards, as well as a touchdown, which he scored by hurdling New England safety Steve Gregory. The Ravens got their redemption with a 31-30 victory.

By October, he was the starting tight end in front of Ed Dickson. Pitta's production began to decline until Week 10, where he had five catches for 67 yards and a touchdown in a 55-20 routing of the Oakland Raiders.

Two weeks later, Pitta caught six passes for 42 yards and the Ravens' only touchdown in a 16-13 overtime win over the San Diego Chargers.

Pitta had five catches for 46 yards and a touchdown in a Week 14 loss to the Washington Redskins.

During Week 15, in a game versus the AFC-leading Denver Broncos, Pitta had what was arguably the best moment of his career. Towards the end of the game, he caught a short pass from Flacco and broke three tackles to complete a 61-yard highlight-reel touchdown. Pitta finished the game with 7 catches for 125 yards and two scores, but the Ravens were still defeated 34-17. His other touchdown was just as impressive, as he caught the ball, somersaulted backwards and stood up in the endzone without being touched by a single Bronco defender.

At the end of the regular season, Pitta's stats were some of Baltimore's best offensively. He had caught 61 passes for 669 yards and seven touchdowns, nearly doubling his stats from 2011.

In the 2013 playoffs, Dennis Pitta shined. In the Wildcard round against the Indianapolis Colts, he caught two passes for 27 yards and a 20-yard touchdown. In both the Divisional round against the Broncos and the Championship game against the Patriots, Pitta had 55 yards apiece, scoring a touchdown in the latter. In Super Bowl XLVII, despite starting the game behind Ed Dickson, Pitta caught four balls for 26 yards and a touchdown to help lead the Ravens to a 34-31 victory over the 49ers. He finished the playoffs with 14 catches, 163 yards and three touchdowns.

2013
On the NFL's annual Top 100 Players list, Pitta barely made the cut, coming in at number 100. On May 13, 2013, the Ravens announced that Pitta signed his second round restricted free agent tender worth $2.023 million.

On July 27, 2013, Pitta suffered a dislocated and fractured hip during training camp and underwent surgery the same night. Pitta was not immediately placed on injured reserve and examinations of the hip revealed no ligament or cartilage damage, but he was still expected to miss the entire season.

In Week 14 of the 2013 season, Pitta returned to on field action for first time since Super Bowl XLVII. He caught 6 passes for 48 yards and a touchdown in a 29-26 win against the Minnesota Vikings. Many people stated that he seemed to pick up exactly where he had left off.

2014
On February 28, 2014, the Baltimore Ravens and Pitta agreed to a five-year $32 million contract. It was believed that Pitta would have a breakout 2014 campaign.

During a game against the Cleveland Browns on September 21, 2014, Pitta left the game with a hip injury. It was revealed that his right hip was dislocated again. He underwent surgery on the same hip the next day and it prematurely ended his 2014 season. On September 1, 2015 Pitta was placed on the PUP list.

2015
On November 11, 2015 The Ravens reported that doctors informed Pitta that it was not safe for him to continue his career. Pitta was placed on season ending injured reserve later that day, but he stated that he had not yet elected to retire from the NFL.

2016
In 2016, Pitta announced that he was going to return to football whenever he was cleared to play. He resumed full practice on September 7, 2016 and played in the season opening game on September 11, 2016 in Baltimore against the Buffalo Bills where he had 3 receptions for 39 yards in the 13–7 win.  In Week 2 against the Cleveland Browns, Pitta had a game-high nine catches for 102 yards — the second 100-yard game of his career.  On Pitta's return, Ravens quarterback Joe Flacco said, "If he was coming back, I knew he would be productive. Last year, when he came back for a couple of weeks of practice and they decided to not have him play, he looked good. He looked like himself. I think he's going to get more and more comfortable as the year goes on. We just have to keep him healthy." On December 4 against the Miami Dolphins, Pitta scored in a game for the first time since Week 14 of the 2013 season. Pitta finished the game with 9 catches for 90 yards and two touchdown receptions in the 38-6 victory. Pitta had statistically his best season, recording a career-high 86 receptions, most in the league by a tight end, and a career-high 729 yards, although he only caught two touchdown passes. Pitta also recorded his first career fumble during the game against Miami.

2017
On June 2, 2017, Pitta suffered another hip injury during organized team activities on a non-contact play. It was later determine that he dislocated his hip for a third time. On June 7, Pitta was released by the Ravens.

He agreed to do color commentary on Ravens radio broadcasts for the first four games of the season, joining three other fellow Ravens alumni in the rotation.

NFL career statistics

Personal life
Pitta is married to Mataya Gissel, whom he met while attending BYU. They have three children together, including a set of twins and his oldest son Decker. He is also brothers-in-law with former Arizona Cardinals' Max Hall, who is married to Gissel's sister, Mckinzi Hall.

References

External links

Baltimore Ravens bio
Brigham Young Cougars football bio

1985 births
Living people
All-American college football players
American football tight ends
Latter Day Saints from California
American Mormon missionaries in the Dominican Republic
Baltimore Ravens players
BYU Cougars football players
Sportspeople from Fresno, California
Players of American football from California
21st-century Mormon missionaries
People from Moorpark, California
Sportspeople from Ventura County, California
National Football League announcers
Baltimore Ravens announcers
Ed Block Courage Award recipients